Hippodrome Waregem (Dutch: Hippodroom van Waregem), located in  Waregem, Belgium, is used for horse racing.  It hosts the annual Great Flanders Steeple Chase, a steeplechase event.  It has a capacity of 40,000 spectators.

References

External links 
 Venue information 
 Hippodroom Waregem homepage

Horse racing venues in Belgium
Sports venues in West Flanders
Cross country running venues